Johannes Buder may refer to:
 Johannes Buder, German gymnast who represented Germany at the 1912 Summer Olympics
  (1884–1966), German botanist at the University of Wrocław Botanical Garden